The US XXXVII Corps (37th Corps) was a 'Phantom Unit' created in 1944 as part of Fortitude South II, a military deception  by the Allied nations during the build-up to the 1944 Normandy landings.

World War II

The corps was first reported to the Germans as arriving during May and June 1944 at Liverpool and establishing its headquarters in Great Baddow near Chelmsford in Essex with the US 17th Infantry Division and US 59th Infantry Division under its command. Initially under the command of US 3rd Army, the corps became part of US 14th Army in the middle of July 1944, where it was to form, with British II Corps the first wave of the Pas de Calais landings.

Following the conclusion of Fortitude South II it was reported as having moved to the region of Worthing in Sussex establishing its headquarters in Goring during August. During late September, early October 1944, US 17th Infantry division was transferred to the command of US XXXIII Corps in exchange for US 25th Armored Division, following which it was announced that the Corps and the units under its command had departed England via Southampton.

Insignia

Writing in The Deceivers: Allied Military Deception in the Second World War, Thaddeus Holt indicated that no official insignia had been issued for the US XXXVII Corps, however, the official report on Operation Fortitude written by Roger Hesketh and published in 1999 under the title ''Fortitude: The D-Day Deception Campaign contained a copy of a message sent by Agent Brutus to the Germans on the 24th of June 1944 which described the insignia as follows:

"The XXXVII Corps recently included in the Third Army, has its headquarters in Great Baddow, two kilometers south-east of Chelmsford; sign: on a yellow circle a diamond divided into two triangles, of which the top is white and the lower black. A third triangle, white, below, touches the black one at the apexes."

Agent Tate, provided the following description of the insignia to the Germans in a report sent on the 27th of August 1944:

"...two similar triangles with their points together (looks like an old fashioned hour glass); the upper triangle is black the lower is white. On the upper black triangle there is a third triangle, the flat side against the flat side of the black triangle. The third triangle is white. The whole thing is on a circular, yellow ground."

References

Footnotes

Bibliography

 
 

037
037